Mauro Buono (born 20 April 1998) is an Argentine professional footballer who plays as a forward for Gimnasia y Esgrima.

Career
Buono's career began with Gimnasia y Esgrima. His professional bow arrived during a 4–2 victory in Primera B Nacional versus Guillermo Brown on 15 May 2016. Four appearances later, in July 2017, Buono scored for the first time after netting in a win away to Crucero del Norte. His first double figures season came in 2016–17 as he appeared ten times whilst scoring once; against Deportivo Morón on 30 April 2018.

Career statistics
.

References

External links

1998 births
Living people
Sportspeople from Jujuy Province
Argentine footballers
Association football forwards
Primera Nacional players
Gimnasia y Esgrima de Jujuy footballers
Sarmiento de Resistencia footballers
Altos Hornos Zapla players